The Rachna College of Engineering and Technology (RCET) is a constituent college of University of Engineering and Technology, Lahore.

History
Realizing the urgent need for technological and engineering education in the region, Government of the Punjab decided to set up an engineering college in 2002 by pooling together the resources of the government and regional industries. On 15 January 2003, the college was inaugurated by then Governor of the Punjab Khalid Maqbool. Previously, it was affiliated with the University of Engineering and Technology, Lahore. In 2006, its status was upgraded from affiliated college to constituent college.

Departments
The college consists of the following departments:

 Department of Electrical Engineering
 Department of Mechanical Engineering
 Department of Industrial and Manufacturing Engineering
 Department of Computer Science
 Department of Natural Sciences and Humanities

Degree programs
The college offers the following degree programs:

BSc Electrical Engineering
BSc Mechanical Engineering
BSc Industrial and Manufacturing Engineering
BSc (Hons) Computer Science

See also 
UET KSK Campus
UET Faisalabad Campus

References

External links
 RCET official website
 UET Lahore official website

University of Engineering and Technology, Lahore
Engineering universities and colleges in Pakistan
Educational institutions established in 2003
2003 establishments in Pakistan